The Arrival is the 38th book in the Animorphs series, written by K.A. Applegate. It has been ghostwritten by Kim Morris. It is narrated by Ax.

Plot summary
When the Animorphs see a front-page newspaper article about the Sharing in San Francisco, they attempt to break into the office of the major local newspaper to determine how deeply infiltrated it is by the Yeerks. Mr. King, a Chee android, is captured and is about to be destroyed, and the group bursts out of hiding to rescue him. It is soon evident that the situation is a trap set up by Visser Three, and he joins the battle, engaging directly with Ax and the others in Andalite form. As the Animorphs try to run, a small group of new Andalites appear out of the elevator, and turn the tides of the battle. Tobias informs them that the police are coming, and the groups call an uneasy truce and depart to maintain secrecy. Ax, excited to see his own people after so long, is afraid to leave them without knowing how to contact them, but a female who fought next to him, Estrid-Corill-Darrath, reveals that they know his identity and will find him.

Back at Cassie's barn, Ax is excited that the Andalite fleet has finally arrived, but the others aren't so sure. After a few assertions that Ax is not seeing the situation clearly, in part because of a crush on Estrid, and a jab from Rachel about where his loyalties lie, Ax leaves the barn in anger after assuring them that he will follow Jake's command. He runs until his anger cools, at which point he realizes that he is deeply infatuated with Estrid.

Tobias and Ax go to the food court where they discover Estrid in human morph making a scene that attracts mall security. They escape with her because Tobias pretended that Estrid was his sister. They set up a meeting with her superiors. The newcomers are offended that Ax disobeyed their orders by bringing Jake (and the others, they soon find out) to the meeting, and that he is following a human's command. After much in-fighting amongst themselves, the small group of Andalites with an out-of-date ship accidentally reveal that they are the only Andalites in the area, and not fore-runners of the fleet as Ax had assumed. The group has been sent to Earth on a mission to assassinate Visser Three. Ax finds himself fighting competitively with the Aristh Estrid, whom he beats, but just barely. He admires her skill in tailfighting, but is confused by her lack of military decorum.

The letdown of the further delay of the fleet causes the Animorphs to split up in a dramatic scene at Cassie's barn. Each member leaves for reasons typical of their character, with Jake finally releasing Ax to try to go home if he can. Ax, once the humans are gone, calls out to Estrid, who has been hiding in the barn in rabbit morph, but poorly concealed due to a lack of understanding of the animal's typical behavior. He tells her he will teach her about Earth, and she takes him back to the Andalite ship.

The other members of the ship are Commander Gonrod-Isfall-Sonilli, Intelligence Advisor Arbat-Elivat-Estoni, and the assassin Aloth-Attamil-Gahar. Ax is shown around the ship by Aloth, who reveals that he was in prison for selling organs off a battlefield prior to the current assignment. Aloth, who is deeply cynical about the whole group, reveals that Gonrod, while an excellent pilot, was also in prison for cowardice during battle, and that Arbat has the Andalite War Council wrapped around his finger. There is some ambiguity as to who the real "leader" of the expedition is. It is revealed to Ax that Arbat is the brother of Alloran-Semitur-Corrass, Visser Three's host. The ship, the Ralek River, is an old laboratory ship, whose lab-level has been sealed off to conserve energy. Ax notes the strangeness of the situation and is certain that Estrid is not really an Aristh after she audaciously announces that she is going to the Gardens and wants Ax to show her around.

The two fly to the Gardens and explore in Andalite form. Estrid asks Ax about jelly beans, and he kicks some M&Ms out of a vending machine for her to try in human morph in response. The two assume human forms, and they kiss after eating. They agree that it is pleasant, though not as much as chocolate. Ax is clearly smitten. On the flight back, he silently contemplates for a moment the idea of running away with Estrid and leaving behind the difficult shades of gray of his life. He shakes off the reverie, and they return to the ship to plan for the morning's attack on the Visser. Ax later suddenly realizes that Estrid had made a joking reference to plintconarhythmic equations, which are employed in an incredibly complex bio-engineering field involving clear thought in n-dimensions, but uneasily writes it off as a figure of speech.

The Andalites (minus Estrid, whom Arbat forces to stay behind) infiltrate the Community Center and make it all the way to the inner sanctum without raising the alarm. Arbat, who has demanded he have the first shot out of pride after Aloth implies that he might not give the order to kill his brother's body, misses an easy shot, even though he has proved himself a competent fighter prior to this mission. A battle ensues, and Ax fails to kill the visser out of a morality-induced hesitation. Aloth is injured when he breaks concentration for a moment to look for Gonrod, who has fled back to the ship. Arbat kills Aloth under the pretense that he "was too injured to save", which is a lie. Furious and confused, Ax is certain that something very strange is going on.

Ax gets Mr. King to help him hack into the ship's computers and gain access to the high-security files concealed by Arbat. All of the members of the Andalite team are officially listed as dead in combat, and Estrid is not on record at all in the military. The ship was listed as destroyed in the same battle. Ax realizes that the ship is on a suicide mission, and that Arbat has something planned that the Andalite War Council does not "officially" know about. Hearing motion on the supposedly empty laboratory level of the ship, Ax confronts Estrid and forces her to talk by threatening to open a vial of some unknown substance of which she is terrified.

Estrid reveals that she was never in the military, but she learned to tail-fight from her famously-skilled brother. She was a young genius and was discovered by Arbat at the university after initially being ignored as a result of her gender. She took up plintconarhythmic physics under his guidance, and she has created a programmable prion virus (the vial that Ax puts down) that will destroy the Yeerks - and very possibly wipe out humans as well. Arbat finds them and traps them, and Ax explains to Estrid that their mission does not officially exist and is not sanctioned by general Andalite society like she was led to believe. Arbat takes the vial of the disease and leaves them. As Estrid apologizes, the Animorphs are revealed to be on board, as their "split-up" was simply a ploy to get Ax in with the Andalites. The Animorphs free them, and the group of seven finds evidence of Arbat and follows him to the Yeerk Pool in human form, except for Tobias, who stays as a hawk.

Ax spots Arbat's human morph by his Andalite instinct to keep looking around now that he has only two eyes, stopping him on the pier over the Yeerk Pool, thus prolonging the chaos by yelling that the Hork-Bajir are Andalite Bandits in disguise. In the ensuing confusion, the Animorphs begin to attack, and Ax and Estrid move to a hidden spot to demorph. Estrid, terrified and disgusted by the Yeerk Pool, refuses to demorph and fight to protect the humans, who are not part of their species. Ax leaves to protect his friends, telling her that she is beautiful and brilliant, but he "[doesn't] think [he likes her] very much." The battle is bloody and the group is outnumbered, though their backs are covered by human hosts who have linked together into a living shield. Arbat makes it back to the pier, and Ax cannot reach him in time. He is about to drop the vial into the pool when Estrid vaporizes it along with Arbat's hand using a Dracon beam. At that moment, Gonrod (at Tobias' urging) burns a hole through the roof of the cavernous complex, and rescues the Animorphs with the Andalite ship. Ax leaves Arbat to die at the hands of the Taxxons.

Ax gives Estrid a cinnamon bun as a parting gift, but he refuses to return home with her. She does not understand his loyalty and dedication to his non-Andalite friends. The fate of Estrid and Gonrod is unknown.

The Animorphs and Ax all assume human forms and enjoy their victory. They walk to get food, although not at the McDonald's as Tobias and Gonrod had destroyed the place to burn into the Yeerk Pool. Despite the unawareness of most of the others, Cassie picks up on Ax's pain and holds his hand as the group walks and he cries, invisibly, in the dark.

Morphs

Trivia
This book marks the second time that the Animorphs have faced a non-Yeerk-controlled Andalite villain.  The first time that this happened was with Captain Samilin in #18: The Decision.

Animorphs books
2000 fantasy novels
2000 science fiction novels
Biological weapons in popular culture
Fiction portraying humans as aliens